

NASCAR racing series
NASCAR currently manages several racing series that range in vehicle styles and formats. There are four major national racing series which include the NASCAR Cup Series, NASCAR Xfinity Series, NASCAR Craftsman Truck Series, and ARCA Menards Series, while the other series are divided up by region. Beginning in 2011, NASCAR began hosting eRacing leagues.

List of NASCAR–sanctioned series
 You can also help Wikipedia by adding references

Current Series

Former Series

See also
NASCAR
ARCA
IndyCar Series
Formula 1
NHRA
American Canadian Tour
World of Outlaws
List of auto racing tracks
List of auto racing tracks in the United States

References

NASCAR
Series